Chalkesh (also Romanized as Chālkesh and Chālkosh; also known as Chālkesh-e Fakhrābād) is a village in Jirhandeh-ye Lasht-e Nesha Rural District, Lasht-e Nesha District, Rasht County, Gilan Province, Iran. At the 2006 census, its population was 18, in 5 families.

References 

Populated places in Rasht County